Murai Maman is a 1995 Indian Tamil language comedy film and the directorial debut of Sundar C. The film stars Jayaram and Khushbu. It was released on 19 May 1995.

Plot 
Sirusu and his elder brother Perusu own a village cinema theatre lot of orchards and farms and they are rich bachelors. Their family gets the first respect in their region. For several years, his family feuded with their rich relative Parameswaran's family. In the past, Sirusu's father was killed by Parameswaran's brother, who was sentenced to death, then Saratha married Parameswaran's relative secretly.

Saratha, Sirusu's sister, comes from Mumbai with her husband and her daughter Indhu. Sirusu falls in love with Indhu at first sight. Ratnam and his father Parameswaran proposes to Saratha's husband to marry Ratnam to his daughter. Indhu's father forces her to marry but she refuses. Indhu decides to leave the village, Sirusu stops her, she says that she doesn't want to marry Ratnam and she isn't in love with Sirusu. The villagers misunderstand their relation. Indhu tells to Ratnam that they were just talking but Sirusu lies to marry Indhu.

Sirusu, as he wanted, gets married with Indhu. However, Indhu refuses to live with him as his wife. Then, she becomes very ill and Sirusu takes care of her. Sirusu's mother explains that he must place a god statue in the village temple to save Indhu. Sirusu accomplishes it with his brother help and Indhu understands Sirusu's feelings.

Ratnam's henchmen beat Sirusu and he gets admitted to the hospital. Ratnam removes Indhu's Thaali and kidnaps her. Sirusu saves his wife, he apologizes to Parameswaran and Ratnam. The two families united together and they lived happily.

Cast 
Jayaram as Sirusu
Khushbu as Indhu
Goundamani as Perusu
Manorama as Sirusu's mother
Sangeetha as Saratha
Jai Ganesh as Sabapathy Saratha's husband
Senthil as Chinna Thambi
Kazan Khan as Rathnam
Vinu Chakravarthy as Parameswaran
Sundar C. in a cameo appearance

Production 
Murai Maman is the directorial debut of Sundar C. He initially wanted a leading action hero to play the lead role and approached Sarathkumar, but the producer was unavailable to sign the actor. Subsequently, the director chose Jayaram to play the lead role in the film. Sundar revealed that he tapped into his innate sense of humour, as Jayaram was very famous for his comedy in Malayalam.

Soundtrack 
The music was composed by Vidyasagar, with lyrics written by Vairamuthu and Palani Bharathi.

References

External links 
 

1990s Tamil-language films
1995 directorial debut films
1995 films
Films directed by Sundar C.
Films scored by Vidyasagar